Juichi Maruyama (born 23 February 1945) is a Japanese alpine skier. He competed in the men's downhill at the 1968 Winter Olympics.

References

1945 births
Living people
Japanese male alpine skiers
Olympic alpine skiers of Japan
Alpine skiers at the 1968 Winter Olympics
People from Nagano (city)
20th-century Japanese people